Parartocarpus venenosa is a tree species in the family Moraceae.

Names
P. venenosa is reconstructed as *lapuka in the Proto-Western Oceanic language, the reconstructed ancestor of the Western Oceanic languages.

References

venenosa